is a passenger railway station located in the city of Chichibu, Saitama, Japan, operated by the private railway operator Chichibu Railway.

Lines
It is also served by through services to and from the Seibu Chichibu Line.

Station layout

The station is staffed and consists of one side platform (platform 1) and one island platform (platforms 2/3) serving three tracks. Stabling and run-round tracks are also provided next to track 3 and in the former freight platforms. A turntable is provided for turning steam locomotives used on SL Paleo Express services.

Platforms

Adjacent stations

History
Mitsumineguchi Station opened on 15 March 1930.

Passenger statistics
In fiscal 2018, the station was used by an average of 384 passengers daily.

Buses

Surrounding area
 Arakawa River

Chichibu Railway Park

A number of old Chichibu Railway vehicles are preserved in the Chichibu Railway Park located on the north side of the station, adjacent to the turntable.

The following vehicles are on display.
 Class DeKi1 electric locomotive number DeKi1
 Class ED38 electric locomotive number ED38 1
 DeHa 100 EMU car number DeHa 107
 KuHaNi 20 EMU car number KuHaNi 29
 SuMu 4000 freight car number SuMu 4023
 ToKi 500 freight car number ToKi 502
 Yo 10 guard's van number Yo 15
 WaKi 800 freight car number WaKi 824
 WaFu 51 freight car number WaFu 51

See also
 List of railway stations in Japan

References

External links

 Mitsumineguchi Station timetable 
 Mitsumineguchi Station information (Saitama Prefectural Government) 

Railway stations in Japan opened in 1930
Railway stations in Saitama Prefecture
Chichibu, Saitama